1994 is the forty-eighth studio album by American country singer Merle Haggard, released in 1994.

Background
Although Haggard's profile remained high in 1994, having been the subject of two tribute albums (Mama's Hungry Eyes: A Tribute to Merle Haggard and Tulare Dust), 1994 was a commercial disappointment, peaking at number 60 on the Billboard country albums chart. It had been four years since Haggard's previous album Blue Jungle, and in his Haggard biography The Running Kind, David Cantwell writes that Haggard, "took to bitching in interviews that Curb was happy enough to use his name for bait, luring future stars like Tim McGraw to the label, but it wouldn't release his music." The album includes a remake of his 1977 hit "Ramblin' Fever."

Reception

Dan Cooper of AllMusic calls 1994 Haggard's strongest album since Big City. Biographer David Cantwell observed in 2013, "When it finally showed up, 1994 improved considerably on Blue Jungle."

Track listing 
"I Am an Island" (Max D. Barnes) – 3:34
"In My Next Life" (Barnes) – 3:48
"Way Back in the Mountains" (Merle Haggard, Barnes) – 3:09
"What's New in New York City" (Haggard) – 2:47
"Set My Chickens Free" (Haggard, Richard Smith) – 2:18
"Chores" (Haggard, Barnes, Billy Davis, Theresa Lane) – 3:06
"Valentine" (Willie Nelson) – 3:09
"Solid as a Rock" (Haggard, Barnes) – 3:11
"Bye, Bye, Travelin' Blues" (Haggard, Dean Holloway) – 2:56
"Troubadour" (Haggard) – 2:28
"Ramblin' Fever" (Haggard) – 3:58

Personnel
Merle Haggard – vocals, guitar
Norm Hamlet – steel guitar
Biff Adams – drums
Don Markham – trumpet, saxophone
Larry Byrom – guitar
Glen Duncan – fiddle
Sonny Garrish – dobro, steel guitar
Owen Hale – drums
Dann Huff – guitar
Abe Manuel, Jr. – guitar
Joe Manuel – guitar
Hilton Reed – guitar
Leland Sklar – bass
Gary W. Smith – piano
Joe Spivey – fiddle
Curtis Wright – background vocals
Curtis Young – background vocals
Production notes:
James Stroud – producer
Hank Williams – mastering
Julian King – engineer
Steve Ledet – assistant engineer
Rodney Good – assistant engineer
Mark Hagen – assistant engineer
Lynn Peterzell – engineer, mixing
Doug Rich – production assistant

Chart positions

Notes

References

1994 albums
Merle Haggard albums
Curb Records albums
Albums produced by James Stroud